The Belz Museum of Asian and Judaic Art is located at 119 South Main Street at the intersection of Gayoso Avenue in Memphis, Tennessee, USA. The museum was opened in 1998 as the Peabody Place Museum and in January 2007 it received its present name.

The museums collection is based on the private collection of Memphis developers Jack and Marilyn Belz, who owned the Peabody Hotel and Peabody Place. The Belz features over 1,000 objects, including works of jade, tapestries, furniture, carvings, and other historical and artistic objects. The museum also houses one of the finest collections of pieces from the Qing dynasty.

See also

 List of museums in Tennessee

References

External links
 Google Maps street view of the Belz Museum

Museums in Memphis, Tennessee
Art museums and galleries in Tennessee
Jewish museums in the United States
Jews and Judaism in Memphis, Tennessee
Asian art museums in the United States
Ethnic museums in Tennessee
Art museums established in 1998
1998 establishments in the United States
Former private collections in the United States
Asian-American culture in Tennessee 
1998 establishments in Tennessee